A technische hogeschool (English: "technical college") in the Netherlands is a type of educational institution for higher education, where mainly (industrial) technical training is given like for engineer, bachelor in electronics, mechanics or automotive technology. Most technical colleges are included in a broader partnership with other colleges. A technical college is distinct level of a technical university.

Education in the Netherlands
Engineering education